Farah Alhaddad  (born 5 May 1997) is an Iraqi fashion model. The Miss Middle East 2018 and 2019

Awards and nominations
 Miss Middle East 2018
 First runner-up for Miss Iraq 2016
Miss Asia Pacific International Iraq 2016
 The Ambassador of Social Affairs for Iraqi Refugees, awarded the title of Minister of Social Affairs Rashid Derbas

See also

References 

1997 births
Living people
Muslim models
People from Diyala Province